Rashard Cook (born April 18, 1977 in San Diego, California) is a former professional American football safety in the National Football League.

Professional career
Cook was selected by the Chicago Bears in the sixth round of the 1999 NFL Draft with the 184th overall pick. He played for the Philadelphia Eagles between 1999 and 2004.

College career
Cook played college football at the University of Southern California.

1977 births
Living people
Players of American football from San Diego
American football safeties
USC Trojans football players
Philadelphia Eagles players